Ulrich Gebauer (born 28 January 1956) is a German actor. He has appeared in more than eighty films since 1981.

Selected filmography

References

External links 

1956 births
Living people
German male film actors